This is a list of notable male boxers. For a list of female boxers, see List of female boxers.

A

William Abelyan
Arthur Abraham
Miguel Acosta
Tomasz Adamek
Ola Afolabi
Joachim Alcine
Devon Alexander
José Alfaro
Muhammad Ali
Elvis Álvarez
Saúl Álvarez
Lou Ambers
Sammy Angott
Alfredo Angulo
Vito Antuofermo
Fred Apostoli
Roman Aramian
Jorge Arce
Alexis Argüello
Henry Armstrong
Mike Arnaoutis
Chris Arreola
Lenin Arroyo
Mike Alvarado
Alex Arthur
Amin Asikainen
Abe Attell
Emanuel Augustus
Ray Austin
Bonifacio Ávila
Alexander Awdijan
Selcuk Aydin

B 

Billy Backus
Tony Badea
Buddy Baer
Max Baer
Joe Baksi
Bob Baker
Carlos Baldomir
Carlos Balderas
Tony Baltazar
Gary Balletto
Marco Antonio Barrera
Miguel Barrera
Monte Barrett
Riddick Bowe
Yan Bartelemí
Carmen Basilio
Brian Battease
Roberto Benitez
Wilfred Benítez
Nigel Benn
Robert Berridge
Andre Berto
Markus Beyer
Riddick Bowe
Timothy Bradley
Adam Braidwood
Livingstone Bramble
Lamon Brewster
Shannon Briggs
Kell Brook
Lucas Browne
Frank Bruno
Lucian Bute
Chris Byrd

C

Canelo Álvarez 
Danilo Cabrera
Robson Conceição 
Ivan Calderón
John Caldwell
Victor Luvi Callejas 
Joe Calzaghe 
Myke Carvalho

D

David Haye
Denton Daley
Domingo Damigella
Vic Darchinyan
Alberto Davila
Chad Dawson
Daniel Dawson
James DeGale
Oscar De La Hoya
Carlos De León
Tony DeMarco
Jack "Nonpareil" Dempsey
Jack Dempsey
Adrian Diaconu
Kid Diamond
David Díaz
Juan Díaz
Nate Diaz
Nick Diaz
Andre Dirrell
George Dixon
Mircea Dobrescu
David Dolan
Nonito Donaire
Leonard Doroftei
Stipe Drviš
John Duddy
Lee Duncan
Bernard Dunne
Johnny Dundee
Jack Dupree
Roberto Durán
Yvon Durelle

E

Graham Earl
Howard Eastman
Hiroyuki Ebihara
Joe Egan
Wayne Elcock
Jimmy Ellis
Lester Ellis
Flash Elorde
Carlos Eluaiza
Zsolt Erdei
Joe Erskine (American boxer); 
Joe Erskine (Welsh boxer)
Alfredo Escalera
Sixto Escobar
Luisito Espinosa
David Estrada
Jason Estrada
Clifford Etienne
Chris Eubank
Alfredo Evangelista

F

Pål Arne Fagernes
Johnny Famechon
Anthony Farnell
Tommy Farr
Jeff Fenech
Tye Fields
James Figg
Chris Finnegan
Kevin Finnegan
Luis Firpo
BJ Flores
Félix Flores
Bob Fitzsimmons
George Foreman
Yuri Foreman
Vernon Forrest
Ricardo Fortaleza
Bob Foster
Jeff Fraza
Joe Frazier
Marvis Frazier
Acelino Freitas
Arturo Frias
Carl Froch
Zora Folley
Al Ford
Ryan Ford
Gene Fullmer
Gene Fullmer
Fred Fulton
Takeshi Fuji
Ali Funeka
Hughie Fury
Tommy Fury
Tyson Fury

G

Tony Galento
Andras Galfi
Víctor Galíndez
Esteban Gallard
Julio Gamboa
Yuriorkis Gamboa
Scott Gammer
Joe Gans
Khaosai Galaxy
Víctor Galíndez
Alejandro García
Alex Garcia
Danny García
Julio César García
Mikey Garcia
Robert Garcia
Roberto García
Arturo Gatti
Khaosai Galaxy
Kaokor Galaxy
Kid Gavilán
Joey Giardello
Julio Gervacio
Daniel Geale
Khoren Gevor
Christian Giantomassi
Joey Giardello
Mike Gibbons
Tommy Gibbons
Vyacheslav Glazkov
Rodney Glunder
George Godfrey (boxer born 1853)
George Godfrey (boxer born 1897)
Matt Godfrey
Arturo Godoy
Alfonso Gomez
Juan Carlos Gomez
Michael Gomez
Wilfredo Gómez
Humberto González
Roman González
Z Gorres
Herol Graham
Howard Grant
Jordan Grant
Rocky Graziano
Harry Greb
Allan Green
Danny Green
Dave Green
Mitch Green
Harold Grey
Emile Griffith
Robert Guerrero
Bobby Gunn
Dominick Guinn
Yoko Gushiken
Joan Guzmán
Juan Guzman

H

Marvin Hagler
Morrade Hakkar
Jim Hall
Matthew Hall
Tsuyoshi Hamada
Naseem Hamed
Mustafa Hamsho
Masahiko Harada
Vivian Harris
Audley Harrison
Scott Harrison
Marvin Hart
Hozumi Hasegawa
Kiyoshi Hatanaka
Takanori Hatakeyama
Gene Hatcher
Matthew Hatton
Ricky Hatton
David Haye
Thomas Hearns
Tom Heeney
Robert Helenius
Pete Herman
Carlos Hernández
Yoan Pablo Hernandez
Richel Hersisia
Alex Hilton
Dave Hilton Jr.
Dave Hilton Sr.
Matthew Hilton
Joe Hipp
Akinobu Hiranaka
Don Holmes
Larry Holmes
Evander Holyfield
Kendall Holt
Lloyd Honeyghan
Bernard Hopkins
Demetrius Hopkins
Keitaro Hoshino
Filip Hrgović 
Marco Huck

I

Ike Ibeabuchi
Sultan Ibragimov
Timur Ibragimov
Hiroki Ioka
Guts Ishimatsu

J

Anthony Joshua
Beau Jack
Rafal Jackiewicz
Julian Jackson
Peter Jackson
Rene Jacquot
Leen Jansen
James J. Jeffries
Lew Jenkins
Esteban De Jesús
Eder Jofre
Chris John 
Ingemar Johansson 
Harold Johnson
Jack Johnson
Kevin Johnson
Leavander Johnson 
Martin John
Marvin Johnson
Roy Jones Jr.
Rocky Juarez
Josiah Judah
Yoel Judah
Zab Judah
Ener Julio
Jorge Eliecer Julio
Joel Julio

K

János Kajdi
Virgil Kalakoda
Georgi Kandelaki
Rocky Kansas
Daiki Kameda
Kouki Kameda
Roman Karmazin
Michael Katsidis
Travis Kauffman
Hiroshi Kawashima
Katsushige Kawashima
Archie Kemp
Ronan Keenan
Colin Kenna
Michael Kenny
Mikkel Kessler
Stanley Ketchel
Amir Khan
Jake Kilrain
Ji-Hoon Kim
Duk Koo Kim
Ji-Won Kim
Leva Kirakosyan
Bep van Klaveren
Piet van Klaveren
Ole Klemetsen
Vitali Klitschko
Wladimir Klitschko
Celes Kobayashi
Hiroshi Kobayashi
Royal Kobayashi
Pawel Kolodziej
Takashi Koshimoto
Armand Krajnc
Luan Krasniqi
Martin Kristjansen
Masashi Kudo
Akhil Kumar
Eagle Kyowa

L

Santos Laciar
Jeff Lacy
Ismael Laguna
Kirkland Laing
Donny Lalonde
Jake LaMotta
Sam Langford
Juan Laporte
Denis Lebedev
Andy Lee
Jesse James Leija
Carlos De León
Benny Leonard
Sugar Ray Leonard
Lennox Lewis
Sergei Liakhovich
Rafael Limón
Jorge Linares
Moos Linneman
Sonny Liston
Little Dado
Nicolino Locche
Duilio Loi
Vasyl Lomachenko
Danny Lopez
Ricardo Lopez
Joe Louis
Tommy Lowne
Sammy Luftspring
Jorge Luján
Ron Lyle
Benny Lynch

M

Kaizer Mabuza
Enzo Maccarinelli
Marcos Rene Maidana
Charlie Magri
Edwin Malave
Paul Malignaggi
Jakob Malz
Saoul Mamby
Lenny Mancini
Ray Mancini
Peter Manfredo
Rocky Marciano
Antonio Margarito
Juan Manuel Márquez
Rafael Márquez
Sergio Martínez
Lloyd Marshall
Bob Martin
Vanes Martirosyan
Oleg Maskaev
Henry Maske
Carlos Maussa
Joey Maxim
Andrew Maynard
Ricardo Mayorga
Floyd Mayweather Jr.
Floyd Mayweather Sr.
Jeff Mayweather
Roger Mayweather
Alessandro Mazzinghi
Samuel Mbugua
Jock McAvoy
Kevin McBride
Paul McCloskey
Gerald McClellan
Wayne McCullough
Glenn McCrory
John McDermott
Thomas McDonagh
Terry McGovern
Barry McGuigan
Victor McLaglen
Jimmy McLarnin
Lenny McLean
Peter McNeeley
Mike McTigue
Sam McVea
Kali Meehan
Carlos Melo
Boyd Melson
Daniel Mendoza
Jean-Paul Mendy
Alberto Mercado
Ray Mercer
Gus Mercurio
Joe Mesi
Dariusz Michalczewski
Tadashi Mihara
Karel Miljon
Freddie Mills
Edison Miranda
Brian Mitchell
Byron Mitchell
Kevin Mitchell
Sharmba Mitchell
Seth Mitchell
Javier Molina
John John Molina
Mahyar Monshipour
Pedro Montañez
Bob Montgomery
Carlos Monzón
Archie Moore
Lauren Moore
Michael Moorer
Sergio Mora
Érik Morales
Carroll Morgan
Steve Molitor
Jean-Marc Mormeck
Tommy Morrison
Shane Mosley
Anthony Mundine
Tony Mundine
John Mugabi
Takuya Muguruma
Bob Murphy
John Murray

N

Lovemore N'dou
Shigeo Nakajima
José Nápoles
Omar Andrés Narváez
Charlie Nash
Nobuo Nashiro
Rolando Navarrete
Orzubek Nazarov
Azumah Nelson
Johnny Nelson
Yutaka Niida
Yosuke Nishijima
Orlin Norris
Terry Norris
Ken Norton
Yoshiaki Numata
Michael Nunn

O

David Obregon
Victor Oganov
Sean O'Grady
Sam Olij
Rubén Olivares
Bobo Olson
George Olteanu
Ajose Olusegun
László Orbán
Carlos Ortiz
Manuel Ortiz
Victor Ortíz
Masao Ohba
Hideyuki Ohashi
Katsuya Onizuka
Sven Ottke
Said Ouali
Kassim Ouma

P

Irene Pacheco
Bobby Pacquiao
Manny Pacquiao
Greg Page
Gerry Peñalosa
Freddie Pendleton
Paul Pender
Rubén Darío Palacios
Carlos Palomino
Antonio Paoli
László Papp
Giovanni Parisi
Kubrat Pulev
Mate Parlov 
Lorenzo Parra
Jean Pascal
Mauricio Pastrana
Toon Pastor
Willie Pastrano
Floyd Patterson
Jimmy Paul
Kelly Pavlik
Vinny Pazienza
Eusebio Pedroza
Willie Pep
James Pereira
Luis Alberto Pérez
Pascual Perez
Eddie Perkins
Samuel Peter
Kostas Petrou
Lyn Philp
Francesco Pianeta
Ellyas Pical
Antonio Pitalúa
Lupe Pintor
Nicky Piper
Pete Podgorski
Alexander Povetkin
Breidis Prescott
Mario Preskar
Ruslan Provodnikov
Aaron Pryor

Q

Dwight Muhammad Qawi
Bobby Quarry
Jerry Quarry
Mike Quarry
Hennie Quentemeijer
Carlos Quintana
Robert Quiroga

R

Pete Rademacher
Zahir Raheem
Hasim Rahman
Victor Emilio Ramirez
Sugar Ramos
Sam Rapira
Pete Ranzany
Tony Reed
Robin Reid
Gil Reyes
Ryan Rhodes
Dick Richardson
Viddal Riley
Nick Ring
Cosme Rivera
Freddie Roach
Paolo Roberto
Sugar Ray Robinson
Graciano Rocchigiani
Ralf Rocchigiani
Adilson Rodrigues
David Rodriguez
Francisco Rodríguez Jr.
Luis Manuel Rodríguez
José Roman
Danny Romero
Omar Niño Romero
Brad Rone
Edwin Rosario
Matthew Rosa
Lionel Rose
Troy Ross
Mike Rossman
Gary Russell Jr.
Leo Rwabwogo

S

Matthew Saad Muhammad
Sandy Saddler
Shozo Saijo
Takefumi Sakata
Alessio Sakara
Vicente Saldivar
Sinan Samil Sam
Salvador Sánchez
Corrie Sanders
Richie Sandoval
Dave Sands
Ahmed Santos
Lee Savold
Félix Savón
Tom Sayers
Max Schmeling
George Scott
Billy Schwer
Al Seeger
Tonton Semakala
Viacheslav Senchenko
Ulderico Sergo
Samuel Serrano
Frédéric Serrat
Archie Sexton
Sam Sexton
Jack Sharkey
Tom Sharkey
Earnie Shavers
Kuniaki Shibata
Ronnie Shields
Yoshio Shirai
Tony Sibson
Mzukisi Sikali
Battling Siki
Anderson Silva
Lakva Sim
Matt Skelton
James Smith
Verdell Smith
Jorge Solís
Julian Solís
Odlanier Solis
Rafael Solis
Ulises Solís
Søren Søndergaard
Albert Sosnowski
Humberto Soto
Paul Spadafora
Cory Spinks
Leon Spinks
Michael Spinks
Terence Spinks
Bill Squires
Adonis Stevenson
Teófilo Stevenson
Bermane Stiverne
Bruce Strauss
Reggie Strickland
Felix Sturm
John L. Sullivan
Chas Symonds

T

Katsunari Takayama
Shinji Takehara
Carlos Támara
Joichiro Tatsuyoshi
Tadashi Tomori
Vittorio Tamagnini
Johnny Tapia
Antonio Tarver
Arnold Taylor
Jermain Taylor
Meldrick Taylor
Glover Teixeira
Drake Thadzi
Marcel Thil
Nico Thomas
Pinklon Thomas
Hasse Thomsén
Tue Bjørn Thomsen
Tony Thompson
Jimmy Thunder
Keith Thurman
Dick Tiger
Hideki Todaka
Katsuo Tokashiki
James Toney
David Torosyan
José Torres
Ricardo Torres
Félix Trinidad
Adam Trupish
Choi Tseveenpurev
Kostya Tszyu
David Tua
Gene Tunney
Buddy Turman
Najai Turpin
Randy Turpin
Regilio Tuur
Mike Tyson

U

Yasutsune Uehara
Juan Urango
Alexander Ustinov
Oleksandr Usyk
Paolino Uzcudun

V

Rodrigo Valdez
Edwin Valero
Benny Valger
Eddie Vallejo
Nikolai Valuev
Arnold Vanderlyde
Fitz Vanderpool
Fernando Vargas
Martín Vargas
Samuel Vargas
Roberto Vásquez
Francisc Vastag
Israel Vázquez
Wilfredo Vázquez
Percy Vear
Hector Javier Velazco
Pancho Villa
Ben Villaflor
Brian Viloria
James Vrij

W

Koichi Wajima
Jersey Joe Walcott
Joe Walcott
Travis Walker
Andre Ward
Micky Ward
Mickey Walker
Rau'shee Warren
Jiro Watanabe
Maurice Watkins
Michael Watson
Jim Watt
Ray Wheatley
Chuck Wepner
Pernell Whitaker
Deontay Wilder
Jess Willard
Aaron Williams
Danny Williams
Holman Williams
Ike Williams
Jeremy Williams
Paul Williams
Harry Wills
Krzysztof Wlodarczyk
Paea Wolfgramm
Pongsaklek Wonjongkam
Bruce Woodcock
Curtis Woodhouse
Lee Woodley
Clinton Woods
Chalky Wright
Winky Wright

Y

Anthony Yarde
Yasuei Yakushiji
Teddy Yarosz
Jimmy Young

Z

Tony Zale
Tom Zbikowski
Alfonso Zamora
Ysaias Zamudio
Daniel Zaragoza
Carlos Zarate
Dejan Zavec
Hein van der Zee
Fritzie Zivic
Stefano Zoff
Henriques Zowa
Fulgencio Zúñiga

See also
List of female boxers

Male
Male boxers
boxers